The 2023 Washington Mystics season will be the franchise's 26th season in the Women's National Basketball Association, and their first season under Head Coach Eric Thibault.

On November 15, 2022, the Mystics announced that former head coach Mike Thibault would be retiring from the coaching side of basketball. He would still retain his General Manager title. They also announced that assistant coach Eric Thibault would be hired as the new head coach for the Mystics.

The Mystics earned the fourth overall pick in the 2023 WNBA Draft through the Draft Lottery system. They entered the lottery with the third best odds, but fell one spot.

Transactions

WNBA Draft

Transactions

Roster Changes

Additions

Subtractions

Roster

Schedule

Regular Season

|- 
| 1
| May 19
| New York
| 
| 
| 
| 
| Entertainment and Sports Arena
| 
|- 
| 2
| May 21
| @ Connecticut
| 
| 
| 
| 
| Mohegan Sun Arena
| 
|- 
| 3
| May 23
| Connecticut
| 
| 
| 
| 
| Entertainment and Sports Arena
| 
|- 
| 4
| May 26
| @ Chicago
| 
| 
| 
| 
| Wintrust Arena
|

|- 
| 5
| June 2
| Dallas
| 
| 
| 
| 
| Entertainment and Sports Arena
| 
|- 
| 6
| June 3 
| Minnesota
| 
| 
| 
| 
| Entertainment and Sports Arena
| 
|- 
| 7
| June 9
| @ Seattle
| 
| 
| 
| 
| Climate Pledge Arena
| 
|- 
| 8
| June 11
| @ Seattle
| 
| 
| 
| 
| Climate Pledge Arena
| 
|- 
| 9
| June 13
| @ Indiana
| 
| 
| 
| 
| Gainbridge Fieldhouse
| 
|- 
| 10
| June 16
| Phoenix
| 
| 
| 
| 
| Entertainment and Sports Arena
| 
|- 
| 11
| June 18
| Chicago
| 
| 
| 
| 
| Entertainment and Sports Arena
| 
|- 
| 12
| June 22
| @ Chicago
| 
| 
| 
| 
| Wintrust Arena
| 
|- 
| 13
| June 25
| @ New York
| 
| 
| 
| 
| Barclays Center
| 
|- 
| 14
| June 28
| Atlanta
| 
| 
| 
| 
| Entertainment and Sports Arena
|
|- 
| 15
| June 30
| @ Atlanta
| 
| 
| 
| 
| Gateway Center Arena
| 

|- 
| 16
| July 2
| @ Dallas
| 
| 
| 
| 
| College Park Center
| 
|- 
| 17
| July 7
| Indiana
| 
| 
| 
| 
| Entertainment and Sports Arena
| 
|- 
| 18
| July 9
| @ Connecticut
| 
| 
| 
| 
| Mohegan Sun Arena
|
|- 
| 19
| July 11
| Seattle
| 
| 
| 
| 
| Entertainment and Sports Arena
| 
|- 
| 20
| July 19
| Indiana
| 
| 
| 
| 
| Capital One Arena
|
|- 
| 21
| July 21
| New York
| 
| 
| 
| 
| Entertainment and Sports Arena
|
|- 
| 22
| July 23
| Phoenix
| 
| 
| 
| 
| Entertainment and Sports Arena
|
|- 
| 23
| July 26
| @ Minnesota
| 
| 
| 
| 
| Target Center
|
|- 
| 24
| July 28
| @ Dallas
| 
| 
| 
| 
| College Park Center
|
|- 
| 25
| July 30
| @ Atlanta
| 
| 
| 
| 
| Gateway Center Arena
|

|- 
| 26
| August 4
| Los Angeles
| 
| 
| 
| 
| Entertainment and Sports Arena
|
|- 
| 27
| August 6
| Los Angeles
| 
| 
| 
| 
| Entertainment and Sports Arena
|
|- 
| 28
| August 8
| @ Phoenix
| 
| 
| 
| 
| Footprint Center
|
|- 
| 29
| August 11
| @ Las Vegas
| 
| 
| 
| 
| Michelob Ultra Arena
|
|- 
| 30
| August 13
| Chicago
| 
| 
| 
| 
| Wintrust Arena
|
|- 
| 31
| August 18
| @ Indiana
| 
| 
| 
| 
| Gainbridge Fieldhouse
|
|- 
| 32
| August 20
| Dallas
| 
| 
| 
| 
| Entertainment and Sports Arena
|
|- 
| 33
| August 22
| Connecticut
| 
| 
| 
| 
| Entertainment and Sports Arena
|
|- 
| 34
| August 26
| Las Vegas
| 
| 
| 
| 
| Entertainment and Sports Arena
|
|- 
| 35
| August 29
| Minnesota
| 
| 
| 
| 
| Entertainment and Sports Arena
|
|- 
| 36
| August 31
| @ Las Vegas
| 
| 
| 
| 
| Michelob Ultra Arena
|

|- 
| 37
| September 3
| @ Los Angeles
| 
| 
| 
| 
| Crypto.com Arena
|
|- 
| 38
| September 5
| @ Phoenix
| 
| 
| 
| 
| Footprint Center
|
|- 
| 39
| September 8
| Atlanta
| 
| 
| 
| 
| Entertainment and Sports Arena
|
|- 
| 40
| September 10
| @ New York
| 
| 
| 
| 
| Barclays Center
|
|-

Standings

Statistics

Regular Season

Awards and Honors

References

External links
 Official website of the Washington Mystics

Washington Mystics
Washington Mystics
Washington Mystics seasons